Potato is a Thai rock band founded in 2001. The band currently has 5 members including lead vocalist Patchai Pukdesusook, guitarist Teekatas Taviarayakul, bassist Piyawat Anukul, drummer Kan Uamsupan, and keyboardist Kiattiyos Malathong. It has released 8 studio albums, one extended play, and several compilation albums. It is considered one of the most successful Thai rock bands.

History 
Potato was formed by Peechanit Oan-Aari (Pee), Nantakrai Cham-Jaiharn (Note), Oranuch Tangdechavut (Nuch), and Suwatin Watthanawitukun (Bom). Potato's original vocalist was Peechanit Oan-Aari (Pee), but he died on 3 October 2002. This led to the band's dissolution, but Potato reunited in 2003. Since 2008, Potato has a new drummer named Kan Uamsupan (Kan) instead of Suwatin Watthanawitukun (Bom), who left the group after recording the "Sense" album. He still makes occasional appearances with the band. Potato's lineup then included Patchai "Pup" Pukdesusook (vocals), Piyawat "Ohm" Anukul (bass), and Kan Uamsupan (drums). The band's last guitarist, Rattanapon "Win" Keng-Rean, left Potato in 2010 and a number of guitarists from other bands have substituted for him since. In 2013, Teekatas "Hang" Taviarayakul joined the band as its latest guitarist.

Band members 
Current members
Patchai Pukdesusook (Pup) – vocals (2001–present)
Piyawat Anukul (Ome) - bass (2003–present)
Kan Uamsupan - drums (2008–present)
Teekatas Taviarayakul (Hung) - guitar (2013–present)
Kiattiyos Malathong (Aum) - keyboard (2013–present)

Former members
Rattanapon Keng-Rean (Win) - guitar (2003–2010) 
Suwatin Watthanawitukun (Bom) - drums (2001–2007)  
Nantakrai Cham-Jaiharn (Note) - guitar (2001–2004)  
Oranuch Tangdechavut (Nuch) - bass (2001–2002)  
Peechanit Oan-Aaree (Pee) - vocals (2001–2002)

Discography

Studio albums

Potato (2001; 1st)
 เร็วมาก (Rew mark)
 เธอไปกับใคร (Ter pai kub krai)
 ร้องไห้ไม่เป็น (Rong hai mai pen)
 ลืมมันซะ (Luem mun sa)
 อยู่นี่ไง..เพื่อน (Yoo nee ngai...puen)
 ทำนองที่หายไป (Tum-nong tee hai pai)
 ไม่ให้ (Mai hai)
 คนดีไม่มีที่อยู่ (Khon dee mai mee tee yoo)
 วันละ 1 หน (Wun la nueng hon)
 ส้วม (Suam)

Go...On (2003; 2nd)
 ไม่ให้เธอไป (Mai hai tur pai)
 ชู้ บี ดู วับ (Choo be doo wub)
 ทำไมหน้าบึ้ง (Tum mai nah bueng)
 ผู้ชายขี้กลัว (Poo chai kee krue)
 ไม่เป็นไรเกรงใจ (Mai pen rai klieng jai)
 น้ำหอม (Num hom)
 กล้าพอไหม (Kla por mai)
 ความทรงจำ (Kwam song jum)
 ลืมตาในน้ำ (Luem tah nai num)
 อย่าไปเสียน้ำตา (Yai pai sei num tah)
 ไม่น่าเลย (Mai nah loey)

Life (2005; 3rd) 
 ที่เดิม (Tee derm)
 ปากดี (Pak dee)
 ลา ลา ลา (La la la)
 วางไว้ (Wang wai)
 ภาษากาย (Pa sar kai)
 Letter
 รักแท้ ดูแลไม่ได้ (Ruk tae doo lae mai dai)
 อย่ามาทำหน้าตาดี (Yah mar tum nah tah dee)
 กำแพง (Gum pang)
 สามเวลา (Sarm we lah)
 หวังดีเสมอ (Wung dee sar mher)

Sense (2007; 4th) 
 บันไดเสียง (Bun dai sieng)
 เพียงพอ (Pieng por)
 คนกลาง (Khon klang)
 ห้ามใจไม่ไหว (Harm jai mai wai)
 เข้าทาง (Kao tarng)
 ฟังความข้างเดียว (Fung kwam karng diew)
 ปล่อย (Ploi)
 นี่แหละความเสียใจ (Nee lae kwam sei jai)
 ถ้าพรุ่งนี้ฉันทําไม่ได้ (Tah proong nee chun tum mai dai)
 ชีวิตที่ขาดเธอ (Chewit tee kard ter)
 Night Life

Circle (2008; 5th)
 Circle
 ทนพิษบาดแผลไม่ไหว (Ton pis baad phae mai whai)
 รอ (Rau)
 ฉันรักเธอ (Chan ruk ther)
 พระจันทร์ดวงเก่า (Pra jun daung kao)
 สิ่งที่ใจต้องการ (Sing tee jai tong karn)
 Share
 เบียด (Biad)
 ยื้อ (Yue) (Feat. เต๋า Sweet Mullet; OST. The Coffin โลงต่อตาย)
 มีอะไรจะเล่าให้ฟัง (Mee aa rai ja lao hai fang)

Human (2011; 6th)
 เล่นลิ้น (Len lin)
 ไม่รู้จะอธิบายยังไง (Mai roo ja ar ti bai yang ngai)
 จำอะไรไม่ได้ (Jum ar rai mai dai)
 ง่ายๆ (Ngai Ngai)
 เธอยัง... (Ther yang)
 Human (Feat. Oang Ab Normal)
 อาย (Ay)
 สัญญา(จะไม่ไปไหน)(San ya ja mai pai nai) Feat. Pol Clash
 อุปสรรคก่อให้รักบังเกิด (Up pa sak kor hai rak bang kird) Feat. Singto Numchok
 รัก...จัดให้ (Rak jad hai)
 สัญญา(จะไม่ไปไหน) (San ya ja mai pai nai) (Original Version)

CHUDTEEJED (2019; 7th)
 อรุณ (Ar roon)
 ฮู้ฮู (Hoo hoo)
 เท่าไหร่ไม่จำ (Tao rai mai jam)
 เธอทำให้ได้รู้ (Ther tam hai dai roo)
 รอย (Roi)
 ทิ้งไว้กลางทาง (Ting wai klang tang)
 เธอคือเรื่องจริง (ใคร) (Ther kue rueng jing (Klai))
 ทุกด้านทุกมุม (Took dan took moom) feat. Pongsit Kamphee
 ดวง (Duang)
 กี่พรุ่งนี้ (Kee phung nee)
 ยังคง (Yang kong)
 สมดุล (Som doon)
 ก็ยังดี (Kor yang dee)
 แค่นี้ (Kae nee)
 ไม่เป็นไร (ตอนเย็น) (Mai pen rai (Thon yen))

Friends (2021; 8th)
 คนตัวเล็ก (Khon tua lek)
 หมดความหมาย (Mod kwam mai)
 สิ่งไม่มีชีวิต (Sing mai mee chee wit) feat. Apiwat Ueathavornsuk
 ยังมีฉัน (Yang mee chan)
 ทำนองที่มีเธอ (Tum nong tee mee ther)
 ไม่มีคำจำกัดความ (Mai mee kam jam kad kwam)
 เพื่อนเธอ (Puen ther)
 ทำเป็นเล่น (Tum pen len) feat. Tae Bomb At Track
 อีกไม่ช้า (Eak mai cha) feat. Slot Machine
 พูดไม่ได้ (Pood mai dai)

Extended plays

ตอนเย็น (Thon-yen) (2013)
 ฮู้ฮู (Hoo hoo)
 กี่พรุ่งนี้ (Kee pung nee)
 Postcard

Compilation albums

Focus (2004)
 ขอบใจ (khorb jai)
 Sassy Girl
 กล้าพอไหม (glah por mai)
 ทำนองที่หายไป (tum norng tee hai bai)
 คนดีไม่มีที่อยู่ (khon dee mai mee tee yuu)
 ไม่ให้เธอไป (mai hai tur bai)
 ซู้ปิดูวับ (shuu be duu wab)
 ผู้ชายขี้กลัว (phuu chai khee gluah)
 ลืมตาในน้ำ (leurm dtaa nai naam)
 เธอไปกับใคร (tur bai gab khrai)

Collection (2006)
 ขอบคุณที่รักกัน (Medium) (Khob khun tee ruk kun)
 ไม่ให้เธอไป (Mai hai ter pai)
 ลืมตาในน้ำ (Luem ta nai narm)
 ปากดี (Park dee)
 ทำนองที่หายไป (Tum norng tee hai pai)
 กล้าพอไหม (Kla por mai)
 คนดีไม่มีที่อยู่ (Khon dee mai mee tee yoo)
 รักแท้ดูแลไม่ได้ (Ruk tae doo lae mai dai)
 Sassy Girl
 ที่เดิม (Tee derm)
 ภาษากาย (Pasa kai)
 ขอบใจ (Khob jai)
 น้ำหอม (Narm hom)
 ขอบคุณที่รักกัน (Acoustic) (Khob khun tee ruk kun)

Refresh (2008)
 รักเธอไปทุกวัน (Ruk ter pai tuk wan)
 อารมณ์สีเทา (A-rom si tao)
 ที่เดิม Refresh (Tee derm Refresh)
 ลา ลา ลา Refresh (La la la Refresh)
 คำตอบของหัวใจ Refresh (Kam tob khong hua jai Refresh)
 นี่แหละความเสียใจ Refresh (Nee lae kwam sei jai Refresh)
 ปากดี Refresh (Park dee Refresh)
 Sassy Girl Refresh
 เพียงพอ Refresh (Pieng por Refresh)
 รักแท้ดูแลไม่ได้ Acoustic Piano (Khob khun tee ruk kun)

Awards
Seed Awards 2005
Seed Popular Song of The Year for Ruk tae doo lae mai dai
Seed Album Of The Year for Life
Top Awards 2005
Best Group Artist
Gmember Award 2009
Best Group Artist of The Year
Sudsapda Yang&Smart 2009
Popular Best Group Artist
Gmember Award 2011
Popular Rock Artist
Popular Song for Mai roo ja ar ti bai yang ngai
Popular Music Video for Mai roo ja ar ti bai yang ngai

References

Thai rock music groups
Musical groups from Bangkok
Musical groups established in 2001